Josh Lynch is a professional rugby league footballer who plays as a er for the Warrington Wolves in the Betfred Super League.

In 2022 Lynch made his début for Warrington in the Super League against the Huddersfield Giants.

References

External links
Warrington Wolves profile

2003 births
Living people
English rugby league players
Rugby league wingers
Warrington Wolves players